The 2018 North Carolina FC season was the club's 12th season of existence. Until the 2017 season, the club was previously known as the Carolina RailHawks. The 2018 season was the clubs first in the USL, having left the NASL at the end of the 2017 season. For the first time since 2009 and its fourth in club history, North Carolina won the Southern Derby, a fan-based U.S. professional soccer cup competition between North Carolina, Charleston Battery, and Charlotte Independence. North Carolina finished the regular season in 9th place with 47 points, missing out on the playoffs by 2 points to Nashville.

Club

Coaching staff

Roster

Transfers

Winter

In:

Out:

Summer

In:

Out:

Competitions

Friendlies

USL

Standings

Results by round

Matches

U.S. Open Cup 

Schedule Source

Squad statistics

Source: Match reports

Appearances and goals

|-
|}

Goal scorers

Disciplinary record

References 

2018
North Carolina Football Club
North Carolina Football Club
2018 in sports in North Carolina